Berwick is an unincorporated community in Seneca Township, Seneca County, Ohio, United States. It is located next to the intersection of East County Road 6 and State Route 587. The community is served by the New Riegel (44853) post office.

History
Berwick was laid out and platted in 1845. The community was named after Berwick, Pennsylvania, the native home of a first settler. A post office called Berwick was established in 1848, and discontinued in 1955.

References

Unincorporated communities in Ohio
Unincorporated communities in Seneca County, Ohio

vo:Berwick